Johannes Masing (born 9 January 1959 in Wiesbaden) is a German jurisprudent, public law and former judge of the Federal Constitutional Court of Germany.

Career
Between 1979 and 1986, Masing studied law and philosophy at the University of Freiburg as well as Piano at the Freiburg Conservatory of Music (Music teacher diploma) and the State University of Music and Performing Arts Stuttgart (Artistic final exam).

In 2002, Masing was a visiting scholar at the University of Michigan Law School, Ann Arbor/USA. Since 2007, he has been a full professor at the Faculty of Law of the University of Freiburg.

A nominee of the Social Democratic Party of Germany, on 15 February 2008 he was elected to succeed Wolfgang Hoffmann-Riem as sitting Justice of the Federal Constitutional Court of Germany in the court's first senate. He was inaugurated on 2 April 2008 and is chiefly responsible for constitutional complaints concerning data protection, privacy and the right to demonstrate.

In a unanimous 2014 decision by the eight-judge First Senate on abolishing a law allowing companies to be passed from generation to generation tax free, Masing – alongside fellow members Reinhard Gaier and Susanne Baer – issued a supplementary decision saying the judgment should have included wording to ensure that revised tax rules did not undercut the basic purpose of inheritance law, which was to hinder excessive concentration of wealth among a privileged few: “The inheritance tax serves not only to generate tax revenue. Rather it is also an instrument of the state to hinder disproportionate accumulation of wealth from generation to generation solely as a result of origin or personal connection.”

Other activities
 German Academic Scholarship Foundation, Board of Trustees
 Schwetzingen Festival, Member of the Board of Trustees

Recognition
2008 – Gay-Lussac-Humboldt Prize for Franco-German Research Cooperation

See also
Federal Constitutional Court of Germany

External links
 Bundesverfassungsgericht -- Justice Masings's website

References

1959 births
Living people
21st-century German judges
German legal scholars
People from Wiesbaden
Justices of the Federal Constitutional Court